Pertti Jarla (born 25 August 1971 in Nastola, Finland) is a Finnish comics artist most famous for his humorous Fingerpori comic strip. Jarla's humor is strongly based on wordplay and he also deals with subjects which are testing the boundaries of political correctness. Jarla is a relatively famous person in Finland and is often interviewed by the Finnish media.

References

External links

Pertti Jarla's official website

1971 births
Living people
Finnish comic strip cartoonists